Ingrida is a predominantly Lithuanian feminine given name, a cognate of the name Ingrid, and may refer to:
Ingrida Ardišauskaitė (born 1993), Lithuanian cross-country skier
Ingrida Šimonytė (born 1974), Lithuanian economist and politician, Prime Minister of Lithuania

References 

Lithuanian feminine given names
Feminine given names